Leitrim, is a small village in County Down, Northern Ireland, approximately 6 miles from Castlewellan, near Dromara. It is set between the Dromara Hills (Slieve Croob) and the Mourne Mountains. It is claimed to be home to the MacCartan clan of Kinelarty. 

Leitrim’s Gaelic club (Liatroim Fontenoys GAC) is disputed to be the oldest in Down – being founded in 1888. Leitrim has developed friendly rivalrys with Kilcoo GAC and Castlewellan GAC. Most years Leitrim will hold a festival in and around the club grounds.

Although there is only one village named Leitrim in south down, near Hilltown there is a small forest area and camping site named Leitrim lodge.

Photos

Places of interest
 Legannany Dolmen is situated nearby, on the slopes of Slieve Croob.
 Leitrim railway station was opened on 24 March 1906 and closed on 2 May 1955.

Notable people
Tom Herron was born in Leitrim and after his death buried at Leitrim Presbyterian church, not far outside the village.

See also 
List of townlands in County Down
List of places in County Down
List of towns and villages in Northern Ireland

References

External links 
 http://www.dromaradgooland.org/contact-us.html

Townlands of County Down
Civil parish of Drumgooland
Villages in County Down